Sound Off is an album by the progressive bluegrass band Country Gentlemen, recorded in 1971.

Track listing

 If I Were Free (Edmonson)
 Cowboys and Indians (Bill Emerson)
 Sea of Heartbreak (Hal David, Hampton)
 I'll Break Out Again Tonight (A.L. Owens, Sanger Shafer)
 Orange Blossom Mandolin (Ervin Rouse)
 These Men of God (Williams)
 Teach Your Children (Graham Nash)
 Yesterday (John Lennon, Paul McCartney)
 Fox on the Run (Tony Hazzard)
 Johnny and Jack Medley
 Bill Bailey (Hughie Cannon)
 By the Side of the Road (Albert Brumley)

Personnel
 Charlie Waller - guitar, vocals
 Jimmy Gaudreau - mandolin, vocals
 Bill Emerson - banjo, vocals
 Bill Yates - bass, vocals
With:
 Mike Auldridge - resonator guitar

References

External links
 https://web.archive.org/web/20091215090142/http://www.lpdiscography.com/c/Cgentlemen/cgent.htm

1971 albums
Rebel Records albums
The Country Gentlemen albums